Lophoscutus is a genus of ambush bugs in the family Reduviidae. There are more than 60 described species in Lophoscutus.

Species
These 61 species belong to the genus Lophoscutus:

 Lophoscutus acunai (Bruner, 1946)
 Lophoscutus affinis (Guérin-Méneville, 1838)
 Lophoscutus alayoi (Zayas, 1966)
 Lophoscutus armatus Kormilev, 1986
 Lophoscutus arnaudi Kormilev, 1988
 Lophoscutus asper (Stål, 1876)
 Lophoscutus aterrimus (Kormilev, 1981)
 Lophoscutus attenuatus (Champion, 1898)
 Lophoscutus balloui (Bruner, 1926)
 Lophoscutus bergrothi (Handlirsch, 1897)
 Lophoscutus brasiliensis Kormilev & van Doesburg, 1986
 Lophoscutus chemsaki Kormilev, 1984
 Lophoscutus confusus Kormilev, 1989-31
 Lophoscutus crassimanus (Fabricius, 1803)
 Lophoscutus dimorphus Kormilev, 1986
 Lophoscutus dominicanus (Kormilev, 1963)
 Lophoscutus dudichi (Kormilev, 1949)
 Lophoscutus froeschneri Kormilev, 1987
 Lophoscutus geijskesi Kormilev & van Doesburg, 1986
 Lophoscutus granulatus (Champion, 1898)
 Lophoscutus haitiensis Kormilev, 1987
 Lophoscutus hispaniolensis Kormilev & van Doesburg, 1991-24
 Lophoscutus inaequalis (Champion, 1898)
 Lophoscutus insignis (Kormilev, 1957)
 Lophoscutus insularis (Dudich, 1922)
 Lophoscutus israeli (Zayas, 1966)
 Lophoscutus julianus (Bruner, 1951)
 Lophoscutus kormilevi (Zayas, 1966)
 Lophoscutus lepidus (Stål, 1862)
 Lophoscutus leucographus (Westwood, 1843)
 Lophoscutus macilentus (Westwood, 1841)
 Lophoscutus margaritis (Kormilev, 1962)
 Lophoscutus marmoratus (Kormilev, 1966)
 Lophoscutus maurus Kormilev, 1989-01
 Lophoscutus michelbacheri Kormilev, 1984
 Lophoscutus mopsus (Handlirsch, 1897)
 Lophoscutus paracrassimanus Kormilev, 1988
 Lophoscutus paraspiculosus (Kormilev, 1953)
 Lophoscutus parvulus (Handlirsch, 1897)
 Lophoscutus patriciae (Zayas, 1966)
 Lophoscutus prehensilis (Fabricius, 1803)
 Lophoscutus productus (Barber, 1939)
 Lophoscutus pugil Kormilev & van Doesburg, 1992-31
 Lophoscutus pulchellus (Westwood, 1841)
 Lophoscutus pulcher (Kormilev, 1981)
 Lophoscutus rideri Kormilev, 1988
 Lophoscutus rileyorum Kormilev, 1990-30
 Lophoscutus rugosipes (Guérin-Méneville, 1857)
 Lophoscutus sagimani Kormilev & van Doesburg, 1986
 Lophoscutus schaffneri Kormilev, 1986
 Lophoscutus spiculissimus (Barber, 1939)
 Lophoscutus subproductus (Kormilev, 1962)
 Lophoscutus subsimilis (Dudich, 1922)
 Lophoscutus thoracicus (Valdés, 1910)
 Lophoscutus vesiculosus (Handlirsch, 1897)
 Lophoscutus virginensis Kormilev, 1986
 Lophoscutus viridis Kormilev, 1984
 Lophoscutus westwoodi (Guérin-Méneville, 1857)
 Lophoscutus woolleyi Kormilev, 1988
 Lophoscutus wygodzinskyi (Kormilev, 1949)
 Lophoscutus ypsilon Kormilev, 1990-30

References

Further reading

 
 
 

Reduviidae
Articles created by Qbugbot